The Window is a 1949 American black-and-white film noir, based on the short story "The Boy Cried Murder" (reprinted as "Fire Escape") by Cornell Woolrich, about a lying boy who suspects that his neighbors are killers. The film, a critical success that was shot on location in New York City, was produced by Frederic Ullman Jr. for $210,000 but earned much more, making it a box-office hit for RKO Pictures. The film was directed by Ted Tetzlaff, who worked as a cinematographer on over 100 films, including another successful suspense film, Alfred Hitchcock's Notorious (1946). For his performances in this film and in So Dear to My Heart, Bobby Driscoll was presented with a miniature Oscar statuette as the outstanding juvenile actor of 1949 at the 1950 Academy Awards ceremony.

Plot
In the late 1940's, in New York's Lower East Side, lives young Tommy Woodry, who has a habit of crying wolf. Late one night, he climbs up the building fire escape and sees his two seemingly normal neighbors, Mr. and Mrs. Kellerson, murder a drunken sailor in their apartment. No one – neither the boy's parents nor the police – believes Tommy when he tells them what he has seen, since they all assume that this is just another of the boy's tall tales.

When Mrs. Woodry takes Tommy to apologize to the Kellersons, he refuses, and they become suspicious of him. When Mrs. Woodry leaves to care for a sick relative, and Mr. Woodry is away at his night job, the murderous neighbors plan to kill Tommy, who has been locked in his room by his father to prevent other escapades. Under the pretense of going to the police, the Kellersons take Tommy to a dark alley, where they try to kill him. Tommy escapes, but the pair quickly recaptures him, taking him to their apartment in a taxi. Tommy screams at a policeman for help, but the officer remembers Tommy as the boy who came to the station earlier and failed to convince the police. The Kellersons fool the cab driver by posing as Tommy's parents. Returning home from work early, Mr. Woodry discovers Tommy missing and asks a neighborhood police officer for help. The officer uses a police box to request a radio car.

Meanwhile, the Kellersons have Tommy secured in their apartment. Tommy escapes and climbs onto the roof, and he is pursued by Mr. Kellerson to a nearby building that is in the process of being demolished. The police officer suggests that Tommy went to see his mother, and he and Mr. Woodry leave the tenement. Tommy sees his father leave in his car and shouts for him, the sound of which alerts Mr. Kellerson to Tommy's location. The chase resumes with Tommy finding the body of the dead sailor and scrambling upstairs; when Kellerson follows the stairwell collapses, leaving him struggling to gain sure footing as he continues grasping for Tommy. Tommy pushes a rafter aside, causing it to collapse and sending Kellerson falling to his death, but the young boy is left stranded on the remainder of the beam suspended many stories above the ground. Neighbors hear his cries for help and send for fire and rescue personnel. A collapsable net is set up below Tommy, and he is encouraged to jump to safety before the beam collapses.

Tommy explains everything as he is escorted to a police cruiser, including where to find Mrs. Kellerson and the murder victim. His father assures him how proud he is as they ride to the police station, and Tommy promises to stop inventing stories.

Cast
 Barbara Hale as Mrs. Mary Woodry
 Arthur Kennedy as Mr. Ed Woodry
 Paul Stewart as Joe Kellerson
 Ruth Roman as Mrs. Jean Kellerson
 Bobby Driscoll as Tommy Woodry
 Anthony Ross as Detective Ross (uncredited)

Production
The story "The Boy Cried Murder" was published in 1947 and optioned by RKO who assigned Fredrick Ullman to produce. Ullman had been head of RKO's documentary and shorts department. Dickie Tyler, who had been in The Bells of St Marys and Christopher Blake was mentioned as a possible star. The film was to be made at RKO's Pathe Studio in New York.

Mel Dinelli, who had written The Spiral Staircase for RKO production chief Dore Schary, adapted the story for the screen, and the movie was given the title of The Window. Ted Tetzlaff was given the job of directing.

Ullman wanted to use a semi-documentary style as he came from that background. RKO executives decided to film in Hollywood then changed their mind and went back to New York. Filming started 10 November 1947. It was the first movie RKO shot in that city in a long time. By the time that the film was ready for release in 1948, the millionaire Howard Hughes had taken over the studio and refused to release it, saying it wouldn't make any money and that Bobby Driscoll wasn't much of an actor. However, in 1949, he was persuaded to release it, and it became a critical and financial success, earning many times its production costs. Driscoll was awarded the Juvenile Oscar for his outstanding performance in it.

Driscoll was under contract with Walt Disney, which "loaned" him to RKO for this film.

Reception

Critical response
When the film was first released, The New York Times lauded the film:

Decades later, in 2003, critic Dennis Schwartz discussed the noir aspects of the film as well as its depiction of the challenges facing parents living in the inner city in the mid-20th century:

TV Guide in its 2008 assessment also praised the thriller, especially Tetzlaff's highly effective composition of scenes and his direction of the camera:

Awards
Wins
 Edgar Allan Poe Awards: Edgar, Best Motion Picture, Mel Dinelli and Cornell Woolrich; 1950.
Honors
 Academy Honorary Award: Juvenile Oscar, "Outstanding Juvenile Actor of 1949", Bobby Driscoll; 1950. 
Nominations
 Academy Awards: Oscar, Best Film Editing, Frederic Knudtson; 1950.
 British Academy of Film and Television Arts: BAFTA Film Award, Best Film from any Source, USA; 1950.
 Writers Guild of America: WGA Award (Screen), Best Written American Drama, Mel Dinelli; 1950.

Adaptations
The film has been remade three times:
 The Boy Cried Murder (1966)
 Cloak & Dagger (1984)
 Witness to a Killing

References

External links 
 
 
 
 

1949 films
1940s psychological drama films
1940s psychological thriller films
American black-and-white films
American psychological drama films
American psychological thriller films
American heist films
Edgar Award-winning works
Film noir
Films based on works by Cornell Woolrich
Films based on short fiction
Films directed by Ted Tetzlaff
Films scored by Roy Webb
RKO Pictures films
1940s heist films
Films set in New York City
1949 drama films
1940s English-language films
1940s American films